Grusonia parishiorum is a species of cactus known by the common names matted cholla and Parish club cholla. It is native to the Mojave and Sonoran Deserts of California and Arizona.

Description
Grusonia parishiorum grows in spreading mats along the sandy ground no more than about 20 centimeters tall. The segments are up to 9 centimeters long by 3 wide and is surfaced in fleshy tubercles bearing many spines each up to 5 centimeters in length. The flower is yellowish and the fruit is yellow and up to 8 centimeters long.

References

External links
Jepson Manual Treatment - Grusonia parishii
Flora of North America
Grusonia parishii - Photo gallery

Cacti of the United States
Flora of the California desert regions
Flora of the Sonoran Deserts
Flora of Arizona
parishii
Flora without expected TNC conservation status